This is a list of the mammal species recorded in the Philippines.

Order: Artiodactyla (even-toed ungulates & cetaceans)

Order: Carnivora (carnivorans)

Order: Chiroptera (bats)

Order: Dermoptera (colugos)

Order: Eulipotyphla (Hedgehogs, shrews, moles and relatives)

Order: Pholidota (pangolins)

Order: Primates

Order: Rodentia (rodents)

Order: Scandentia (treeshrews)

Order: Sirenia (manatees and dugongs)

See also
:Category:Endemic fauna of the Philippines
Wildlife of the Philippines
List of threatened species of the Philippines 
Wild pigs of the Philippines
List of birds of the Philippines

References

External links

 
Mammals
Philipp
 Philippines
Philippines